Seahorse Standard was a multi-purpose vessel operated by Defence Maritime Services under contract to the Royal Australian Navy (RAN).

The vessel was engaged in March 2014 in the search for Malaysia Airlines Flight 370 in the South Indian Ocean.

As part of Seahorse Standard duties while based at Stirling, she was tasked as the submarine escape and rescue support vessel.

Citations

References

 
 

1980 ships
Ships built in Newfoundland and Labrador
Vessels involved in the search for Malaysia Airlines Flight 370